Temple of Apollo can refer to:

Cyprus
Temple of Apollo Hylates, Limassol

Czech republic
Temple of Apollo, Lednice–Valtice Cultural Landscape, South Moravian Region

Greece
Temple of Apollo, Corinth
Temple of Apollo (Delphi)
Temple of Apollo at Bassae
Temple of Apollo Patroos, Athens
Temple of Apollo Zoster, Vouliagmeni in Attica
Temple of Apollo (Kolona), Aegina town, Aegina, Saronic Islands
Temple of Apollo, Thermon
Temple of the Delians, at Delos
Temple of Apollo, Dreros, Crete
Temple of Apollo, Gortyn, Crete
Temple of Apollo Daphnephoros, Eretria

Italy
Temple of Apollo Palatinus, in Rome
Temple of Apollo Sosianus, in Rome
Temple of Apollo (Pompeii)
Temple of Apollo (Syracuse), Sicily
Temple C (Selinus), at Selinunte (formerly identified as a Temple to Herakles)

Malta
Temple of Apollo (Melite), now largely destroyed

Turkey
Temple of Apollo Didyma, Aydın
Temple of Apollo Miletus, Aydın
Temple of Apollo Clarus, in Izmir Province
Temple of Apollo (Side), in Antalya
Temple of Apollo Smintheus (Hamaxitus), in Çanakkale
Temple of Apollo (Hierapolis), in Denizli

See also
Apollo#Oracular cult
 The Apollo of Temple, the original name of an indoor arena at Temple University in Philadelphia now known as Liacouras Center